Chanda Rubin defeated Laurence Courtois in the final, 6–2, 7–5 to win the girls' singles tennis title at the 1992 Wimbledon Championships.

Seeds

  Meike Babel (third round)
  Chanda Rubin (champion)
  Lindsay Davenport (second round)
  Pam Nelson (second round)
  Anna Smashnova (quarterfinals)
  Rossana de los Ríos (semifinals)
  Nancy Feber (third round)
  Ai Sugiyama (quarterfinals)
  Cătălina Cristea (third round)
  Elena Likhovtseva (quarterfinals)
  Ninfa Marra (first round)
  Ludmila Richterová (first round)
  Larissa Schaerer (third round)
  Mami Donoshiro (third round)
  Annie Miller (second round)
  Julie Steven (third round)

Draw

Finals

Top half

Section 1

Section 2

Bottom half

Section 3

Section 4

References

External links

Girls' Singles
Wimbledon Championship by year – Girls' singles